Cardup is an outer suburb of the Western Australian capital city of Perth, located in the Shire of Serpentine-Jarrahdale to the north of the town Mundijong.

History
In 1844, surveyor Robert Austin recorded that Cockburn Sound Location 22 was called Cardoup. The brook joining the northern boundary of this location has been shown at various times as either Cardoup or Cadup Brook. In 1851, the location was purchased by H. Mead, who gave his address as Cardup and this spelling was used for the brook on most subsequent plans and surveys. By 1927, a railway siding had been erected nearby and was called Cardup after the brook and although the siding is no longer in use, the place still retains the name. Cardup is an Aboriginal name said to mean "place of the racehorse goanna" (Kurda).

References

External links

Suburbs of Perth, Western Australia
Shire of Serpentine-Jarrahdale